South Korean girl group Red Velvet has embarked on three concert tours since their debut under SM Entertainment in 2015. They kicked off their debut concert tour, titled Red Room, with a 3-day show at the Olympic Hall in Seoul in August 2017 before continuing with 10 shows in Japan, attracting about 52,000 people in total. Red Velvet's first world tour, Redmare, began at the SK Olympic Handball Gymnasium in Seoul in August 2018, and continued with shows in Thailand, Taiwan, Singapore, Japan, United States and Canada. Their 5-date tour in Japan was attended by a total of around 40,000 people. 

Red Velvet's third concert tour, La Rouge, began in November 2019 and saw 5 shows in South Korea and Japan before being halted in early 2020 due to the COVID-19 pandemic. The group's next concert tour will be called R to V and will begin at the KSPO Dome in Seoul in April 2023.



Headlining tours

Red Velvet 1st Concert "Red Room"

Red Velvet 2nd Concert "Redmare"

Red Velvet 3rd Concert "La Rouge"

Red Velvet 4th Concert "R to V"

One-off concerts

Fan meetings

Showcases

Music festivals

Award shows

Concert participation 
 SM Town Live World Tour IV (2014–2015)
 SM Town Live World Tour V (2016)
 SM Town Live World Tour VI (2017–2018)
 SM Town Live Culture Humanity (2021)
 SM Town Live 2022: SMCU Express at Kwangya (2022)
 SM Town Live 2022: SMCU Express (2022)
 SM Town Live 2023: SMCU Palace at Kwangya (2023)

Notes

References

Concert tours
Red Velvet
Red Velvet